Carlia is a genus of skinks, commonly known as four-fingered skinks or rainbow skinks, in the subfamily Eugongylinae. Before being placed in this new subfamily, Carlia was recovered in a clade with the genera Niveoscincus, Lampropholis, and others of the Eugongylus group within Lygosominae.

Species
The genus Carlia contains the following species (n.b., a binomial authority in parentheses indicates that the species was originally described in a genus other than Carlia):

Carlia aenigma (Zug, 2004) – enigmatic rainbow skink
Carlia ailanpalai (Zug, 2004) – curious skink
Carlia amax (Storr, 1974) – bauxite rainbow-skink
Carlia aramia (Zug, 2004) – Aramia rainbow skink
Carlia babarensis (Kopstein, 1926)
Carlia beccarii (W. Peters & Doria, 1878)
Carlia bicarinata (Macleay, 1877) – rainbow-skink
Carlia bomberai (Zug & Allison, 2006)
Carlia caesius (Zug & Allison, 2006)
Carlia crypta Singhal, Hoskin, Couper, Potter, & Moritz, 2018
Carlia decora Hoskin & Couper, 2012 – elegant rainbow-skink
Carlia diguliensis (Kopstein, 1926) – Digul River rainbow skink
Carlia dogare (Covacevich & Ingram, 1975) – sandy rainbow-skink
Carlia eothen (Zug, 2004)
Carlia fusca (A.M.C. Duméril & Bibron, 1839) –  brown four-fingered skink, Indonesian brown skink
Carlia gracilis (Storr, 1974) – slender rainbow-skink
Carlia inconnexa Ingram & Covacevich, 1989 – Whitsunday rainbow-skink
Carlia insularis Afonso-Silva, Santos, Ogilvie & Moritz, 2017 – Kimberley islands rainbow-skink
Carlia isostriacantha Afonso-Silva, Santos, Ogilvie & Moritz, 2017 – Monsoonal three-keeled rainbow-skink
Carlia jarnoldae (Covacevich & Ingram, 1975) – lined rainbow-skink
Carlia johnstonei (Storr, 1974) – rough brown rainbow-skink
Carlia leucotaenia (Bleeker, 1860)
Carlia longipes (Macleay, 1877) – closed-litter rainbow-skink
Carlia luctuosa (W. Peters & Doria, 1878)
Carlia munda (De Vis, 1885) – shaded-litter rainbow-skink
Carlia mysi (Zug, 2004) – Mys's rainbow skink
Carlia nigrauris (Zug, 2010)
Carlia pectoralis (De Vis, 1885) – open-litter rainbow-skink
Carlia peronii (A.M.C. Duméril & Bibron, 1839)
Carlia pulla (T. Barbour, 1911)
Carlia quinquecarinata (Macleay, 1877) – five-keeled rainbow-skink, five-carinated rainbow-skink
Carlia rhomboidalis (W. Peters, 1869) – blue-throated rainbow-skink
Carlia rostralis (De Vis, 1885) – black-throated rainbow-skink, hooded rainbow skink
Carlia rubigo Hoskin & Couper, 2012 – orange-flanked rainbow-skink
Carlia rubrigularis (Ingram & Covacevich, 1989) – red-throated rainbow-skink, northern red-throated skink
Carlia rufilatus (Storr, 1974) – red-sided rainbow-skink
Carlia schmeltzii (W. Peters, 1867) – robust rainbow-skink, Schmeltz's skink
Carlia sexdentata (Macleay, 1877) – six-toothed rainbow-skink
Carlia spinauris (Smith, 1927)
Carlia storri (Ingram & Covacevich, 1989) – brown bicarinate rainbow-skink
Carlia sukur Zug & Kaiser, 2014 – Sukur four-toed skink
Carlia tetradactyla (O'Shaughnessy, 1879) – southern rainbow-skink
Carlia triacantha (Mitchell, 1953) – desert rainbow-skink
Carlia tutela (Zug, 2004)
Carlia vivax (De Vis, 1884) – lively rainbow-skink, tussock rainbow-skink
Carlia wundalthini (Hoskin, 2014) – Cape Melville rainbow skink

See also

Carlina (name)

References

Further reading
Dolman G, Hugall AF (2008). "Combined mitochondrial and nuclear data enhance resolution of a rapid radiation of Australian rainbow skinks (Scincidae: Carlia)". Molecular Phylogenetics and Evolution 49 (3): 782–794.
Gray JE (1845). Catalogue of the Specimens of Lizards in the Collection of the British Museum. London: Trustees of the British Museum. (Edward Newman, printer). xxviii + 289 pp. (Carlia, new genus, p. 271).

 
Lizard genera
Taxa named by John Edward Gray
Skinks of Australia